Socialist Alternative is a Trotskyist political party in the Canadian province of Quebec. It is affiliated to International Socialist Alternative.

It was formed in 2009 by former members of the Communist Party of Quebec as the Movement for the Socialist Party of Quebec (Mouvement pour le Parti socialiste du Québec, MPSQ). In 2010 it renamed itself in order to prevent confusion about its role and objectives, particularly due to association in people's minds with the centre-left Socialist Party in France.

Quebec national question
Socialist Alternative supports national sovereignty for Quebec. However, the party states that it does not consider independence as an end in itself and that it is opposed to nationalist sovereignty as promoted by the Parti Québécois. Rather, it holds that a left-wing independence movement can serve to embolden workers and bring questions of economic democracy and planning to the fore. It therefore works with other left organisations to promote a programme for an anti-capitalist Quebec.

See also
Socialist Alternative (Canada), sister organization outside of Quebec

References

External links
Socialist Alternative
International Socialist Alternative website

Communism in Quebec
Far-left politics in Canada
Quebec
Trotskyist organizations in Canada
Provincial political parties in Quebec
Political parties established in 2009
2009 establishments in Quebec